Toufik is an Arabic male given name. Notable people with this name include:

 Toufik, alias of Mohamed Mediène, Algerian secret services officer
 Toufik Addadi (born 1990), Algerian football player
 Toufik Benamokrane (born 1980), Algerian football player 
 Toufik el-Hibri (1869–1954), Lebanese scout
 Toufik Mansour, Israeli mathematician
 Toufik Mekhalfi (born 2002), French squash player
 Toufik Moussaoui (born 1991), Algerian football player
 Toufik Mouyet (born 1977), Algerian football player
 Toufik Zeghdane (born 1992), Algerian football player
 Toufik Zerara (born 1986), Algerian football player
 Toufik Benedictus "Benny" Hinn (born 1952), Benny Hinn, Israeli Christian pastor and revivalist